Hanukkah or Chanukkah ben Obadiah was a hypothetical Khazar ruler who probably reigned during the mid to late ninth century CE. Hanukkah was the son of Obadiah and succeeded his nephew Manasseh I to the throne. No contemporary records from his reign survive; however, he is known from the Khazar Correspondence between Hisdai ibn Shaprut and the Khazar king Joseph. As with the other Bulanids, it is unclear whether Hanukkah was a khagan or a khagan bek; however, most modern scholars lean towards the latter possibility.  Historical authenticity and accuracy  of the only document mentioning his name has been questioned.

Hanukkah was succeeded by his son Isaac.

References

Sources
Kevin Alan Brook. The Jews of Khazaria. 2nd ed. Rowman & Littlefield Publishers, Inc, 2006.update
Douglas M. Dunlop, The History of the Jewish Khazars, Princeton, N.J.: Princeton University Press, 1954.
Norman Golb and Omeljan Pritsak, Khazarian Hebrew Documents of the Tenth Century. Ithaca: Cornell Univ. Press, 1982.

Khazar rulers
Jewish monarchs
9th-century rulers in Europe
9th-century Jews
Jewish royalty